Scaur Water is a river which rises near Polskeoch in the Scaur hills in the region of Dumfries and Galloway, Scotland.

It flows from its source near Sanquhar in the Southern Uplands and joins the River Nith two miles southwest of Thornhill. During its course it descends from 500m to 55m altitude, and forms part of the boundary between Tynron and Keir Parishes.

The river valley, the Scaur Glen, displays several sculptures by Andy Goldsworthy and Bronze Age forts, and is lined for much of its length with birch and oak forest.

The river is renowned for trout fishing and canoeing, especially at the Glenmarlin Falls near Penpont. A local legend tells of the ghosts of a horse and rider who drowned in a deep pool, known colloquially as the Black Hole, at the bottom of the falls.

References

Rivers of Dumfries and Galloway
1Scaur